LMS Journal of Computation and Mathematics was a peer-reviewed online mathematics journal covering computational aspects of mathematics published by the London Mathematical Society.  The journal published its first article in 1998 and ceased operation in 2017.  An open access archive of the journal is maintained by Cambridge University Press.

Abstracting and indexing
The journal is abstracted and indexed in MathSciNet, Scopus, and Zentralblatt MATH.

References

External links

English-language journals

Hybrid open access journals
Mathematics education in the United Kingdom
Mathematics journals